Jagadulla is a rural municipality located in Dolpa District of Karnali Province of Nepal.

The rural municipality is divided into total 6 wards and the headquarters of the rural municipality is situated at Kaigaun.

Demographics
At the time of the 2011 Nepal census, 89.4% of the population in Jagadulla Rural Municipality spoke Nepali, 9.2% Sherpa and 1.1% Tamang as their first language; 0.3% spoke other languages.

In terms of ethnicity/caste, 52.5% were Chhetri, 24.2% Kami, 9.3% Bhote, 5.2% Tamang, 4.2% Magar, 3.3% Thakuri, 1.0% Damai/Dholi and 0.3% others.

In terms of religion, 83.5% were Hindu and 16.5% Buddhist.

References

External links
 Official website

Populated places in Dolpa District
Rural municipalities in Karnali Province
Rural municipalities of Nepal established in 2017